The Wilburn Brothers were an American country music duo from the 1950s to the 1970s, consisting of brothers Virgil Doyle Wilburn (1930–1982) and Thurman Theodore "Teddy" Wilburn (1931–2003).

Biography 
The brothers were born in Hardy, Arkansas. They first attracted attention as child performers, beginning in 1937, in an act called The Wilburn Children; Roy Acuff discovered them and brought them to the Grand Ole Opry in 1940. Due to federal child labor laws, the Wilburns were forced to leave the Opry after six months.

After growing up, they continued to travel and were regulars on the similar Louisiana Hayride program in Shreveport from 1948 until 1951. After the family act disbanded, and the brothers served stints in the US Army during the Korean War, they continued in 1953 as The Wilburn Brothers touring with Faron Young and Webb Pierce. They signed with Decca Records in May 1954, and had their first hit record the same year, backing Webb Pierce, on "Sparkling Brown Eyes." Other notable hits include "Go Away With Me" (1956), "Which One Is To Blame" (1959), "Trouble's Back In Town" (1962), "It's Another World" (1965), and "Hurt Her Once For Me" (1967).

In 1956, the Wilburns were offered the chance to record "Heartbreak Hotel" before Elvis Presley. After hearing the song they decided against recording it, describing it as "strange and almost morbid".

In addition to being successful artists, the Wilburns formed the Sure-Fire Music Publishing Company (with Don Helms) in 1957, as well as  the Wil-Helm Talent Agency in the early 1960s. They were instrumental in launching the careers of many country musicians, most notably Loretta Lynn, whom they signed to their music publishing company. Lynn was the "girl singer" of the Wilburns' touring show between 1960 and 1968, and she made weekly appearances on their syndicated television show from 1963 to 1971. They also helped develop the career of Patty Loveless between 1973 and 1975, by having her tour with them on weekends and during school breaks.

The Wilburn Brothers had a syndicated television program, The Wilburn Brothers Show, that ran from 1963 to 1974, with 354 half-hour episodes produced. Reruns can still be seen on the cable network RFD-TV and in the UK on Rural TV. They were Opry members from 1953 until the time of Doyle's death from lung cancer on October 16, 1982 (at age 52). Teddy continued with the Opry as a solo artist, until his death on November 24, 2003, of congestive heart failure, just six days before his 72nd birthday.

They are both buried in the Nashville National Cemetery in Nashville, Tennessee.

The brothers long awaited biography, Two For The Show, will hit bookstores in 2022.

Discography

Albums

Singles

Footnotes

References 
 Bush, Johnny – Mitchell, Rick (2007), Whiskey River (Take My Mind): The True Story of Texas Honky-Tonk, University of Texas Press
 Carlin, Richard (2003), Country Music: A Biographical Dictionary, Taylor & Francis
 Diekman, Diane (2007), Live Fast, Love Hard: The Faron Young Story, University of Illinois Press
 Ellison, Curtis W. (1995), Country Music Culture: From Hard Times To Heaven, University Press of Mississippi
 Hefley, James C. (1992), Country Music Comin' Home, Hannibal Books
 Hoffman, Frank W. - Ferstler, Howard (2004), Encyclopedia of Recorded Sound, Volume 1, CRC Press

External links 
 [  Allmusic entry.]

American country music groups
Country music duos
Grand Ole Opry members
Four Star Records artists
Decca Records artists
People from Sharp County, Arkansas
Musical groups established in 1954
Burials in Tennessee
Sibling musical duos